"Bionic" is a song recorded by American singer Christina Aguilera, taken from her sixth studio album of the same name (2010). The song was written by Aguilera, Kalenna Harper, John Hill and Switch, while production was done by the latter two. "Bionic" is an electronic number and has garnered comparisons to works by artists including Santigold and Janet Jackson.

Aguilera performed "Bionic" as an introduction to "Not Myself Tonight" on a number of occasions, including the 2010 MTV Movie Awards, The Today Show and VH1 Storytellers. Upon the release of Bionic, the song peaked on the US Billboard Hot 100 at number 66, and on the Korean Gaon International Download Chart at number 23.

Background and recording 
After the birth of her son, Aguilera stated in an interview with Ryan Seacrest that her forthcoming album would include a totally new aspect of herself as an artist, because of the pregnancy with her son. During an interview with People in 2008, Aguilera stated that she was going to start recording new material for her forthcoming album at her home in Beverly Hills. On the album, entitled Bionic, Aguilera was inspired by electronic and electronica music, which she heard a lot during her pregnancy.

Aguilera also commented about the album during an interview with Ryan Seacrest, "It's really a fun, fun record. Really futuristic. I was inspired by a lot of electronic music, electronic artists, and so you'll hear all those elements". She added, "[There are] different textures and things with my voice that I was really playing around with and having fun with on this record that I never even knew I could do, vocally". "Bionic" was recorded at three places: Dubsided recording studio in Los Angeles, California, Dreamland Studios and Mad Decent Mausoleum in Philadelphia. Aguilera's vocals were recorded at The Red Lips Room in Beverly Hills, California. The track was written by Aguilera, Kalenna Harper, John Hill and Switch. Hill and Switch also produced and provided musical instruments to "Bionic".

Composition and critical reception

It features "twitchy space-ace" rhythms, rapping verses and talks about an "echo-laden" invitation to "jet off to the new millennium". In the middle of the song, Aguilera spells out her name, "X-x-x-t-t-t-i-i-i-n-n-n-n-n-a". During the chorus, she sings, "Bionic, so damn Bionic, gonna get you with my electronic supersonic rocket, ay".

Becky Bain of Idolator wrote that "This track showcases more of the adventurous new directions Christina said she hoped to try on this album. We like it!" She further compared "Bionic" to works by Santigold. Similarly, Michael Cragg from musicOMH wrote that the song "sounds just like a Santigold track, which is no bad thing". PopMatters critic Omar Kholeif simply described the track as "a thumping" number, while Melinda Newman of HitFix deemed it "a futuristic song, with interesting beats". Newman also compared "Bionic" to Janet Jackson's "Rhythm Nation", "but not nearly as captivating". Entertainment-related website Tan's Topic wrote that the song has "an almost camp sci-fi vibe".

Live performances

On June 6, 2010, Aguilera performed "Bionic" for the first time at the 2010 MTV Movie Awards, held at Gibson Amphitheatre in Los Angeles, California. There, she sang the track as the introduction to "Not Myself Tonight" and "Woohoo". During the performance of "Bionic", she sported curly platinum hair and was dressed in a "diamond-encrusted one-piece" while sitting on a "gilded throne". Caryn Ganz from Rolling Stone opined that the way Aguilera began the performance was similar to Madonna during the latter's Sticky & Sweet Tour (2008–09). Then, Aguilera walked on the stage and "leather-clad" back-up dancers in silver and black outfits began to perform a dance routine. The performance was met with mainly negative reviews and failed to gain impact from media outlets. Tamar Anitai for MTV Buzzworthy was not impressed toward her performance, summarizing it "was all about her "I-I'm-still-a-diva" vocals, frenzied stage show, and adult-only innuendo... And then this happened". In a positive view, James Montgomery for MTV News praised her looking as "a 23rd-century queen" and the show "got millions of people all hot and bothered".

On June 8, 2010, Aguilera performed "Bionic" as the introduction to "Not Myself Tonight" on The Today Show, along with "Beautiful", "Fighter" and "You Lost Me". Selected as the opener of the show, she performed in her "hinestone tights" and "red hot pants". Following the highly criticized performance at the 2010 MTV Movie Awards, Aguilera's performance at The Today Show was well received by most critics. James Dinh for MTV News named it "aggressive", while Erika Brooks Adickman for Idolator called the performance a "hot-mess show wardrobe". Simon Vozick-Levinson for Entertainment Weekly, however was mixed towards the "Bionic" and "Not Myself Tonight" part. He wrote that the two songs aren't "memorable", yet praising her vocals: "definitely better voice than she was". Aguilera also appeared on music television series VH1 Storytellers and sang "Bionic" and "Not Myself Tonight", with "Beautiful" as the follow-up. The singer's performances during the show were later aired on June 13, 2010.

Credits and personnel
Recording locations
Recording – Dubsided, Los Angeles; Dreamland Studios, Philadelphia; Mad Decent Mausoleum, Philadelphia
Vocal recording – The Red Lips Room, Beverly Hills, California.

Personnel
Songwriting – Christina Aguilera, John Hill, Switch, Kalenna Harper
Production – John Hill, Switch
All instruments – John Hill, Switch

Credits adapted from the liner notes of Bionic, RCA Records.

Chart performance
Following the release of Bionic, the song debuted on two national charts due to strong digital download sales. In South Korea, it debuted on the International Singles Chart at number 23 during the week of July 13 to 19, 2010. In the United States, "Bionic" debuted at number 40 on the Billboard Hot Digital Songs chart for and remained on the chart for one week. It subsequently peaked at number 66 on the US Billboard Hot 100 chart.

References

Christina Aguilera songs
2010 songs
Songs written by John Hill (record producer)
Songs written by Christina Aguilera
Songs written by Kalenna Harper
Songs written by Switch (songwriter)
American electronic songs